Capital punishment in the Gaza Strip has been practiced by the Hamas Administration since it assumed power in 2007. The punishment is given for offenses such as crimes against Islamic law, land sales to Israelis, and treason. The Hamas administration of the Gaza Strip inherited the Palestinian National Authority code of law, which included the death penalty for several kinds of offenses, but while the Palestinian administration in Ramallah has refrained from executing capital punishments, death sentences are periodically performed by Hamas.
Palestinian law requires approval from the Palestinian Authority president for the death penalty, but Hamas in Gaza has carried out executions without permission.

History
According to an Amnesty International report, 23 Palestinians were executed in the Gaza Strip by Hamas during the 2014 conflict with Israel. Amnesty claimed that Hamas used the cover of 2014 Gaza war to carry out summary executions, including to “settle scores” against opponents under the pretext they were “collaborators with Israel”.

According to Amnesty, 23 Palestinians were executed by Hamas in the course of the 2014 conflict - 16 of them imprisoned from before the conflict. From among the executed, 6 were killed by a firing squad outside a mosque in front of hundreds of spectators including children.

The Palestinian Center for Human Rights reported in December 2015 that Hamas issued nine death sentences in 2015. Hamas had sentenced four Gazans to death during the first weeks of 2016, all on suspicion of spying.

In February 2016, the armed wing of Palestinian militant group Hamas carried out execution of Mahmoud Ishtiwi - one of the group’s leading commanders, under allegations of gay sex and theft. Ishtiwi left two wives and three children.

In May 2016, Hamas reportedly executed three men by firing squad and hanging. The execution was performed in the al-Katiba prison. The executed men were convicted for murder. Reportedly, the execution defied protests from the United Nations and "will likely" deepen tensions with the Palestinian government in the West Bank. Hamas defied an agreement with Fatah, the ruling party in the West Bank, by carrying out the executions without the approval of Palestinian President Mahmoud Abbas. Hamas later announced that 13 additional prisoners are to be executed.

In April 2017, it was reported that three Palestinians were executed by Hamas in Gaza Strip over alleged collaboration with Israel. Reportedly, the men were hanged at a Hamas police compound, as dozens of Hamas leaders and officials watched the killing.

On 4 September 2022, Hamas announced it had executed five men, including two men condemned over collaboration with the occupation (Israel), and three others in criminal cases. A a resident of Khan Younis born 1968 was convicted of supplying Israel in 1991 with “information on men of the resistance, their residence… and the location of rocket launchpads”;  a second man, born 1978, was for supplying Israel in 2001 with intelligence “that led to the targeting and martyrdom of citizens” by Israeli forces, according to Hamas. The other three men had been convicted for murder (including Murad Abu Zeid). According to B'Tselem, Hamas courts handed down 13 death sentences in January-August 2022, but had not carried out any since 2017.

Executed people

See also

Human rights in the Gaza Strip
Religion and capital punishment

References

Gaza Strip
Human rights in the Gaza Strip
Islam and capital punishment
Death in the Gaza Strip
2007 establishments in the Palestinian territories
2007 in the Gaza Strip